Events in 1990 in animation.

Events

January
 January 14: The Simpsons episode "Bart the Genius" is first broadcast, featuring the signature title sequence with Bart's chalkboard gag and the family's couch gag. Bart Simpson also uses the phrase "Eat My Shorts" for the first time and the characters Edna Krabappel and Martin Prince make their debuts.
 January 21: The Simpsons episode "Homer's Odyssey" is first broadcast with Otto Mann, Chief Wiggum, Waylon Smithers, Jasper Beardley, Sherri and Terri making their debuts.
 January 28: The Simpsons episode "There's No Disgrace Like Home" is first broadcast with the policemen Lou and Eddie making their debuts.

February
 February 4: The Simpsons episode "Bart the General" is first broadcast with Nelson Muntz making his debut. 
 February 11: The Simpsons episode "Moaning Lisa" is first broadcast with Bleeding Gums Murphy making his debut.
 February 18: The Simpsons episode "The Call of the Simpsons" is first broadcast.
 February 25: The Simpsons episode "The Telltale Head" is first broadcast with Sideshow Bob, Apu Nahasapeemapetilon, Reverend Lovejoy, Jimbo Jones, Dolph Starbeam and Kearney Zzyzwicz making their debuts.

March
 March 18: The Simpsons episode "Life on the Fast Lane" is first broadcast with Lenny Leonard and Helen Lovejoy making their debuts.
 March 25: The Simpsons episode "Homer's Night Out" is first broadcast with Carl Carlson making his debut.
 March 26: 62nd Academy Awards: 
 Balance wins the Academy Award for Best Animated Short Film.
 Alan Menken's soundtrack for The Little Mermaid receives the Academy Award for Best Original Score, Menken and Howard Ashman win the Academy Award for Best Original Song for their song  "Under the Sea". The song was performed by singer Samuel E. Wright, and influenced by the musical styles calypso and reggae.

April
 April 15: The Simpsons episode "The Crepes of Wrath" is first broadcast where Bart travels to France, which marks the first of many episodes involving the Simpsons family visiting another country. In the same episode Agnes Skinner makes her debut.
 April 21: The drug prevention TV cartoon Cartoon All-Stars to the Rescue airs on four channels at once in the United States. It is notable for officially featuring cartoon characters from different animation studios all together in one film.
 April 29: The Simpsons episode "Krusty Gets Busted" is first broadcast with Kent Brockman making his debut. While Sideshow Bob had appeared in an earlier episode in the season, this is the first time that the character is voiced by Kelsey Grammer and revealed to be a criminal.

May
 May 13: The Simpsons episode "Some Enchanted Evening" is first broadcast. It was supposed to be the first episode aired, but was pushed back due to production and animation issues.

July
 July 6: Hanna-Barbera releases Jetsons: The Movie.

August
 August 3: DuckTales the Movie: Treasure of the Lost Lamp is first released.
 August 8: The first episode of Moomin is broadcast.

September
 September 7: The first episode of TaleSpin, produced by the Walt Disney Company, airs.
 September 8: 
 The first episode of Bobby's World is broadcast.
 New Kids on the Block, a celebrity animated TV show based on the popularity of the boy band New Kids on the Block airs, but only lasts a season.
 The first episode of Fox's Peter Pan & the Pirates airs.
 September 14: The first episode of Tiny Toon Adventures airs.
 September 15: The first episode of Captain Planet and the Planeteers airs.
 September 13: Woody Woodpecker receives a star on the Hollywood Walk of Fame.
 September 25: The first episode of The Dreamstone airs.
 September 28: The Danish film War of the Birds is first released.
 September 29: The first episode of Widget airs.

October
 October 7: The first episode of Mannetje & Mannetje is broadcast on TV, an adaptation of Hanco Kolk and Peter de Wit's photo comic of the same name. This marks the first time that computer techniques are used in Dutch animation.
 October 11: The Simpsons episode "Bart Gets an "F"" is first broadcast with Mayor Quimby making his debut.
 October 18: The Simpsons episode "Simpson and Delilah" is first broadcast.
 October 19: Fantasia  is added to the National Film Registry.
 October 25: The first Halloween episode of The Simpsons is broadcast, "Treehouse of Horror", guest starring James Earl Jones and marking the debuts of Kang and Kodos. The Halloween-themed episodes will become an annual tradition for the show.

November
 November 1: The Simpsons episode "Two Cars in Every Garage and Three Eyes on Every Fish" is first broadcast.
 November 8: The Simpsons episode "Dancin' Homer" is first broadcast, guest starring Tony Bennett. 
 November 15: The Simpsons episode "Dead Putting Society" is first broadcast.
 November 16: The Walt Disney Company releases The Rescuers Down Under, directed by Hendel Butoy and Mike Gabriel. It is the first animated Disney film to use the CAPS system, the first to fully use digital ink and paint, and the first to be produced without cameras. The same day, the film studio also releases The Prince and the Pauper by George Scribner.
 November 22: The Simpsons episode "Bart vs. Thanksgiving" is first broadcast.
 November 29: Peter in Magicland premiers.

December
 December 6: The Simpsons episode "Bart the Daredevil" is first broadcast, featuring the classic scene where Homer Simpson skateboards over a gorge. After the episode, the animated music video Do the Bartman, starring The Simpsons and co-written by Bryan Loren and Michael Jackson, is first broadcast.
 December 20: The Simpsons episode "Itchy & Scratchy & Marge" is first broadcast.

Specific date unknown
 Milan Blažeković' The Magician's Hat premiers.
 JoWonder's The Brooch Pin and the Sinful Clasp premiers.

Films released

 January 1 - The Mind's Eye: A Computer Animation Odyssey (United States)
 January 3 - The Murtal Master and 108 Youkai (South Korea)
 January 16 - The Trace Leads to the Silver Lake (East Germany)
 February 3 - The Murder Ticket Is Heart-Colored (Japan)
 February 24 - Ojisan Kaizō Kōza (Japan)
 February 25 - An Idol at Will (Japan)
 March 1:
 The Curse of Kazuo Umezu (Japan)
 Gdleen (Japan)
 March 10:
 Doraemon: Nobita and the Animal Planet (Japan)
 Dragon Ball Z: The World's Strongest (Japan)
 March 21:
 Carol: A Day in a Girl's Life (Japan)
 Like the Clouds, Like the Wind (Japan)
 March 23 - I skog och mark (Sweden)
 March 31 - Maroko (Japan)
 April 3 - Obatarian (Japan)
 April 14 - Heavy (Japan)
 April 25 - Onimaru – Five Youths Running on the Battlefield (Japan)
 April 28 - Flight of the White Wolf (Japan)
 June 1 - How the Shoemakers Raised a War for a Red Skirt (Czechoslovakia)
 June 4 - Summer with Kuro (Japan)
 June 12 - Black Bento (Japan)
 June 23 - Gude Crest – The Emblem of Gude (Japan)
 July 6 - Jetsons: The Movie (United States)
 July 7 - Dragon Ball Z: The Tree of Might (Japan)
 July 14 - Soreike! Anpanman: Baikinman no Gyakushuu (Japan)
 July 20 - Lupin III: The Hemingway Papers (Japan)
 July 21 - Project A-Ko Versus Battle 1: Gray Side (Japan)
 July 28 - Robot Taekwon V 90 (South Korea)
 August 3 - DuckTales the Movie: Treasure of the Lost Lamp (United States)
 August 19 - The Magician's Hat (Yugoslavia)
 August 21 - Project A-Ko Versus Battle 2: Blue Side (Japan)
 August 24 - Riki-Oh 2: Child of Destruction (Japan)
 August 25:
 City Hunter: Bay City Wars (Japan)
 City Hunter: Million Dollar Conspiracy (Japan)
 "Eiji" (Japan)
 Marina the Manga Artist Goes to Camelot (Japan)
 August 26 - Soreike! Anpanman: Minami no Umi o Sukue! (Japan)
 September 14 - The Fine Feathered Friend Movie (United States)
 September 15 - Kobo-chan Special: Filled with Autumn!! (Japan)
 September 22 - Tenjōhen – Utsunomiko (Japan)
 September 28 - War of the Birds (Denmark)
 October 1 - Aries: Shinwa no Seiza Miya (Japan)
 October 17 - Dragon Ball Z: Bardock – The Father of Goku (Japan)
 November 1 - New Karate Hell Weird: Blood Apocalypse (Japan)
 November 16 - The Rescuers Down Under (United States)
 November 21 - The Nutcracker Prince (Canada) & (United States)
 November 29:
 Peter in Magicland (Germany)
 Werner – Beinhart! (Germany)
 December - Desperta Ferro (Spain and Germany)
 December 15 - Chibi Maruko-chan (Japan)
 December 20 - Dragon and Slippers (United States, United Kingdom, and Hungary)
 December 21 - New Karate Hell Weird: Blood War Gate (Japan)
 December 22 - A Wind Named Amnesia (Japan)
 December 28 - Sword for Truth (Japan)
 December 29 - The Adventures of Lotty (South Korea)
 Specific date unknown:
 The Fool of the World and the Flying Ship (United Kingdom)
 From Tale to Tale (Soviet Union)
 Naksitrallid (Estonia)

Television series

Television series endings

Births

January
 January 4: Spencer Rothbell, American television writer (Clarence, Victor and Valentino, Twelve Forever) and voice actor (voice of  Miguelito in Victor and Valentino, Colin in Twelve Forever, continued voice of the title character in Clarence).
 January 6: Natalie Palamides, American actress, comedian and writer (voice of Buttercup in The Powerpuff Girls, the Uncle Grandpa episode "Pizza Eve" and the Teen Titans Go! episode "TTG v PPG", Aunt Bitsy in Future-Worm!, Foolduke, Kitten Barrel and Snail in Star vs. the Forces of Evil, Kayla and Willow in Bob's Burgers, teen Eda Clawthorne in The Owl House, Calliope in Rapunzel's Tangled Adventure, Winnie the Werewolf in the OK K.O.! Let's Be Heroes episode "Monster Party", Teresa in the Momma Named Me Sheriff episode "Bald Boyz", Face Doll #1 and Uma Thurman in the Robot Chicken episode "May Cause Numb Butthole", Jenna in the Family Guy episode "The Lois Quagmire", Fern in the Amphibia episode "Sprivy").

February
 February 3: Ryan Bartley, American voice actress (voice of Hanako Kamado in Demon Slayer: Kimetsu no Yaiba, Ram in Re:Zero - Starting Life in Another World, Shoko Ieiri in Jujutsu Kaisen, Rei Ayanami in the Netflix dub of Neon Genesis Evangelion, Fluff in Miraculous: Tales of Ladybug & Cat Noir).
 February 16: The Weeknd, Canadian singer-songwriter and record producer (voice of Madea in the Robot Chicken episode "Endgame", Orion Hughes and Darius Hughes in The Simpsons episode "Bart the Cool Kid", himself in the American Dad! episode "A Starboy is Born").

March
 March 1: Aaron Long, Canadian animator, filmmaker and writer (BoJack Horseman, Tuca & Bertie).
 March 4: Andrea Bowen, American actress and singer (voice of Faline in Bambi II, Moogle Girl in Final Fantasy VII: Advent Children, Sandy and Teen Girl in King of the Hill, Talia al Ghul in the Batman: The Brave and the Bold episode "Sidekicks Assemble!").
 March 31: Landon McDonald, American actor (voice of Enmu in Demon Slayer, Noritoshi Kamo in Jujutsu Kaisen, Alexei Zelenoy in Amain Warrior at the Borderline, Slobot in Power Players).

May
 May 3: Harvey Guillén, Mexican-American actor (voice of Funny the Funhouse in Mickey Mouse Funhouse, Perrito in Puss in Boots: The Last Wish, Alton in Archer, José and Brett in Human Resources, Angmar in The Owl House episode "Through the Looking Glass Ruins", Henrique in The Casagrandes episode "The Bros in the Band", Nightwing in the Harley Quinn episode "There's No Ivy in Team", additional voices in Teenage Euthanasia).
 May 13: Monica Ray, American actress (voice of Miko Kubota in Glitch Techs).
 May 16:
Thomas Brodie-Sangster, English actor (voice of Ferb Fletcher in Phineas and Ferb, John Tracy in Thunderbirds Are Go).
Marc John Jefferies, American actor (voice of young Green Lantern in the Justice League Unlimited episode "Kid Stuff").

June
 June 15: Denzel Whitaker, American actor (voice of Albert in The Ant Bully, Jake in the What's New, Scooby-Doo? episode "Camp Comeoniwannascareya", Kyle in the Handy Manny episode "Join the Club", Sergeant Gutter in The Boondocks episode "Bitches to Rags").
 June 19: Ashly Burch, American voice actress (voice of Enid Mettle in OK K.O.! Let's Be Heroes, Molly McGee in The Ghost and Molly McGee, Rutile Twins in Steven Universe), and writer (Adventure Time).

July
 July 6: Jeremy Suarez, American actor (voice of Koda in Brother Bear and Brother Bear 2, Tippy in The Land Before Time VIII: The Big Freeze, Russell in Fat Albert, Kai in Zambezia, Wally in The Proud Family Movie, Nuebert in the Max Steel episode "Fun in the Sun", Scared Boy in the Hey Arnold! episode "The Journal").
 July 20: Iris Menas, American actor (voice of Odee Eliot in Madagascar: A Little Wild, Fred in Ridley Jones, Frankie Stein in Monster High).
 July 24: Daveigh Chase, American actress, singer and model (voice of Lilo Pelekai in the Lilo & Stitch franchise, Chihiro Ogino in Spirited Away, Joyce Summitt and Tracy Mabini in Fillmore!, Betsy in Betsy's Kindergarten Adventures).

August
 August 2: Saki Nitta, Japanese voice actress (voice of Pakuri in Kill la Kill, Bridget Faye and Cache Dop in D.Gray-man Hallow, dub voice of Dogo in The Lion Guard, Bullied Sheep in Zootopia, and Rosa Rivera in Coco), (d. 2022).
 August 9: Emily Tennant, Canadian actress (voice of Ghost Spider in Marvel Super Hero Adventures, the title character in Polly Pocket, Mary Test in Johnny Test).
 August 23: Wesley Singerman, American guitarist, record producer, songwriter and former child actor (voice of Lars in The Little Polar Bear, Charlie Brown in A Charlie Brown Valentine, Charlie Brown's Christmas Tales and Lucy Must Be Traded, Charlie Brown, Wilbur Robinson in Meet the Robinsons).
 August 29: Erika Harlacher, American voice actress (voice of Sasha in Sword Art Online, Elizabeth Liones in The Seven Deadly Sins, Ann Takamaki in Persona 5: The Animation, Hailey Ann Thomas in Yo-Kai Watch, Ondine in Miraculous: Tales of Ladybug & Cat Noir).

September
 September 15: Max Mittelman, American actor (voice of Saitama in One-Punch Man, Kousei Arima in Your Lie in April, Hikari Sakishima in Nagi-Asu: A Lull in the Sea, Kin in The Seven Deadly Sins, Ritsu Kageyama in Mob Psycho 100, Inaho Kaizuka in Aldnoah.Zero, Atsushi Nakajima in Bungo Stray Dogs, Nacht Faust in Black Clover, Meruem in Hunter x Hunter, Hisamitsu Noto in Toradora!, Plagg in Miraculous: Tales of Ladybug & Cat Noir, Jimmy Olsen in Justice League Action, Overflow in Ben 10, Lion-O and Wilykat in ThunderCats Roar, Cheshire Cat in Alice's Wonderland Bakery).

November
 November 13: Kathleen Herles, American voice actress (voice of Dora in Dora the Explorer and Go, Diego, Go!).
 November 26: Rita Ora, English singer and songwriter (voice of Luthera / Wandering Blade in Kung Fu Panda: The Dragon Knight).
 November 27: Shane Haboucha, American actor (voice of Billy Batson and young Superman in Justice League Unlimited, Robin in Justice League: The New Frontier).

December
 December 8: Dana Terrace, American animator, writer, producer, and storyboard artist (Gravity Falls, creator of and voice of Tiny Nose in The Owl House).

Deaths

January
 January 2: Alan Hale Jr., American actor (voice of Skipper in The New Adventures of Gilligan and Gilligan's Planet), dies at age 68.
 January 8: Terry-Thomas, English actor and comedian (voice of Sir Hiss in Robin Hood), dies at age 78.
 January 19: Tommy Luske, American actor (voice of Michael Darling in Peter Pan), dies at age 42.
 January 24: Gerry Johnson, American actress (voice of Betty Rubble in the final two seasons of The Flintstones), dies at age 71.

February
 February 16: Tadanari Okamoto, Japanese animated film director and producer (Echo Incorporated), dies at age 58.

March
 March 18: Robin Harris, American comedian and actor (Bebe's Kids), dies from a heart attack at age 36.

April
 April 7: Dick Lundy, American animator and film director and producer (Walt Disney Company, MGM, Walter Lantz, Hanna-Barbera, co-creator of Donald Duck), dies at age 82.

May
 May 2: David Rappaport, English actor (voice of MAL in Captain Planet and the Planeteers), commits suicide at age 38.
 May 16: Jim Henson, American puppeteer (Muppet Babies) dies at age 53.
 May 25: Vic Tayback, American actor (voice of Carface in All Dogs Go to Heaven), dies at age 60.
 May 31: William Timym, Austrian-English animator and comics artist (Bleep and Booster and Bengo the Boxer), dies at age 87.

June
 June 21: Margaret J. Winkler, American animation producer and film distributor (Pat Sullivan, Fleischer Brothers, Walt Disney) and wife of Charles Mintz, dies at age 95.

July
 July 17:
George Waiss, American animator and comics artist (Walter Lantz, Walt Disney Company, Warner Bros. Cartoons, Fleischer Brothers, Fine Arts Films, Filmation), dies at age 83.
Bernard Cowan, Canadian actor (narrator in Spider-Man, The Marvel Super Heroes, and Rocket Robin Hood), dies at age 68.

August
 August 17: Pearl Bailey, American actress and singer (voice of Mrs. Elephant in Tubby the Tuba, Big Mama in The Fox and the Hound), dies at age 72.
 August 26: Retta Scott, American artist (Walt Disney Animation Studios), dies at age 74.

September
 September 5: Jerry Iger, American animator (Fleischer Studios) and comics publisher, dies at age 87.
 September 13: Joaquin Garay, Mexican actor (voice of Panchito Pistoles in The Three Caballeros), dies at age 78.

October
 October 7: Grim Natwick, American animator and film director (Fleischer Studios, designed Betty Boop, worked for Ub Iwerks, Walter Lantz, Walt Disney Company, UPA, Richard Williams), dies at age 100.

November
 November 4: Hicks Lokey, American animator (Fleischer Studios, Walter Lantz, Walt Disney Studios, Hanna-Barbera), dies at age 86.
 November 12: Dave Willock, American actor (narrator in Wacky Races, voice of Augustus "Gus" Holiday in The Roman Holidays), dies at age 81.
 November 19: Nicholas Tafuri, American animator (Fleischer Studios, Famous Studios, Ralph Bakshi), dies at age 77.

December
 December 21: Susi Weigel, Austrian illustrator, comics artist and animator, dies at age 76.
 December 23: Serge Danot, French animator and film director and producer (The Magic Roundabout), dies at age 59.
 December 27: Helene Stanley, American actress (model for Cinderella in Cinderella, Aurora in Sleeping Beauty, and Anita Radcliffe in One Hundred and One Dalmatians), dies at age 61.

See also
1990 in anime

Sources

External links 
Animated works of the year, listed in the IMDb

 
1990s in animation